The Jardin botanique Méditerrannéen, also known as the Jardin botanique à Durban-Corbières, is a privately owned botanical garden that contains more than 500 species of plants from the Mediterranean Basin. It is located on the Route d'Albas in Durban-Corbières, Aude, Languedoc-Roussillon, France, and is open daily; an admission fee is charged.

See also 
 List of botanical gardens in France

References 
 Jardin botanique Méditerrannéen
 Jardins Languedoc entry (French)
 Parcs et Jardins entry (French)
 Gralon.net entry (French)

Gardens in Aude
Botanical gardens in France